The St Patrick's Cathedral or just Bunbury Cathedral is a religious building which is the main place of Catholic worship in the city of Bunbury, Western Australia, and is the seat of the Bishop of the Diocese of Bunbury. The current bishop is Gerard Holohan.

The first stone was laid in 1919. The church was opened for worship only two years later, as a parish church. In 1954 he was elevated to a cathedral by Pope Pius XII, while the Catholic Diocese of Bunbury was established.

On May 16, 2005, a tornado devastated the city, damaging the cathedral to the point of being required demolition. The new St. Patrick's Cathedral was built in five years and was dedicated on March 17, 2011, by Bishop Gerard Holohan.

See also
Roman Catholicism in Australia
St. Patrick's Cathedral (disambiguation)

References

Roman Catholic cathedrals in Western Australia
Buildings and structures in Bunbury, Western Australia
Roman Catholic churches completed in 1921
State Register of Heritage Places in the City of Bunbury
20th-century Roman Catholic church buildings in Australia